The men's 3000 metres steeplechase event at the 2002 Commonwealth Games was held on 27 July.

Results

References
Official results
Results at BBC

3000
2002